The following is a list of mummy films.

Films

References

External links 
 IMDB – Keyword Mummy